Kate Kearins is a New Zealand business academic. As of 2018 she is a full professor at the Auckland University of Technology.

Academic career

Kearins has multiple degrees from the University of Waikato, including a 1997 PhD titled  'Local government power relations : a genealogical study'  and an MA in French from Massey University. She co-authored 'Thesis Survivor Stories: Practical Advice on Getting Through Your PhD or Masters Thesis' with Marilyn Waring.

Since 2003 she has been working at Auckland University of Technology rising to full professor.

Kearins' research focuses on sustainability.

Kearins is involved in Catholic tertiary education at a national level.

Selected works 
 Milne, Markus J., Kate Kearins, and Sara Walton. "Creating adventures in wonderland: The journey metaphor and environmental sustainability." Organization 13, no. 6 (2006): 801–839.
 Livesey, Sharon M., and Kate Kearins. "Transparent and caring corporations? A study of sustainability reports by The Body Shop and Royal Dutch/Shell." Organization & Environment 15, no. 3 (2002): 233–258.
 Kearins, Kate, and Delyse Springett. "Educating for sustainability: Developing critical skills." Journal of management education 27, no. 2 (2003): 188–204.
 Byrch, Christine, Kate Kearins, Markus Milne, and Richard Morgan. "Sustainable “what”? A cognitive approach to understanding sustainable development." Qualitative Research in Accounting & Management 4, no. 1 (2007): 26-52.
 Bendell, Jem, and Kate Kearins. "The political bottom line: the emerging dimension to corporate responsibility for sustainable development." Business Strategy and the Environment 14, no. 6 (2005): 372–383.

References

External links
 
  
 

Living people
New Zealand women academics
University of Waikato alumni
Massey University alumni
Academic staff of the Auckland University of Technology
Year of birth missing (living people)
New Zealand women writers